The 2009 World Figure Skating Championships was a senior international figure skating competition in the 2008–09 season. Medals were awarded in the disciplines of men's singles, ladies' singles, pair skating, and ice dancing.

Results from these World Championships were used to determine the majority of the spots available for each country at the 2010 Winter Olympics: 24 spots in singles, 16 in pairs, and 19 in ice dancing, with the remaining spots determined at an Olympic qualifying event in the fall of 2009. As every year, Worlds also determined the entries by country for the following year's event.

The event was held in the Staples Center at L.A. Live in Los Angeles, California, USA from March 23 to 29, 2009.

The compulsory dance was the Paso Doble.

Qualification
The competition was open to skaters from ISU member nations who had reached the age of 15 by July 1, 2008. The corresponding competition for younger skaters was the 2009 World Junior Championships.

Based on the results of the 2008 World Championships, each country was allowed between one and three entries per discipline. National associations selected their entries based on their own criteria.

Countries which qualified more than one country per discipline:

Schedule
(Local time, UTC-7)

 Tuesday, March 24
 13:00 - 17:05 Compulsory dance
 18:15 - 18:40 Opening ceremonies
 19:00 - 23:40 Pairs' short program
 Wednesday, March 25
 09:00 - 12:55 Men's short program (1st Half)
 13:30 - 18:20 Men's short program (2nd Half)
 19:00 - 23:00 Pairs' free skating
 Thursday, March 26
 12:30 - 16:50 Original dance
 17:35 - 21:45 Men's free skating
 Friday, March 27
 08:45 - 12:50 Ladies' short program (1st Half)
 13:20 - 17:30 Ladies' short program (2nd Half)
 18:30 - 23:00 Free dance
 Saturday, March 28
 16:00 - 20:00 Ladies' free skating
 Sunday, March 29
 14:00 - 16:30 Gala Exhibition

Competition notes
It was the first time that skaters represented Montenegro at an ISU Championship and the first time skaters represented Brazil and Ireland at the World Championships.

Kim Yuna set an ISU world record of 76.12 points for the ladies short program and a world record of 207.71 points for the ladies overall score.

In the men's short program, Sergei Voronov and Jeremy Abbott tied with a total score of 72.15. The tie was broken by the technical mark and so Voronov placed 9th in that segment and Abbott 10th.

It was the second year in a row that the world champion did not attempt or complete a quadruple jump, leading to continued criticism from bronze medalist Brian Joubert. Patrick Chan, the silver medalist, would then criticize Joubert, saying he was only concerned about quads and not the whole program. See also quadruple jump controversy for more.

Results

Men
Evan Lysacek became the first American to win since Todd Eldredge in 1996. His victory was described as unexpected, since he was not able to attempt a quadruple jump due to injury.

Men's short program

 TSS: Total Segment Score
 TES: Technical Element Score
 PCS: Program Component Score
 SS: Skating Skills
 TR: Transitions
 PE: Performance/Execution
 CH: Choreography
 IN: Interpretation
 Ded: Deductions
 StN: Starting Number

Men's free skating

Men's final standings

Ladies

Ladies' short program

Ladies' free skating

Ladies' final standings

 WD = Withdrawn

Pairs

Pairs short program

Pairs free skating

Pairs final standings

Ice dancing

Ice dancing compulsory dance

 TI: Timing
 PF: Performance

Ice dancing original dance

 MO: Linking Footwork/Movements
 IT: Interpretation/Timing

Ice dancing free dance

Ice dancing final standings

Medals summary

Medals by country

Medalists

References

 Competitors list

External links

 Official site
 

World Figure Skating Championships
World Championships
F
International figure skating competitions hosted by the United States
World Figure Skating Championships
Sports competitions in Los Angeles
World Figure Skating Championships
World Figure Skating Championships